The 2009 Greek Ice Hockey Championship season was the eighth season of the Greek Ice Hockey Championship. Seven teams participated in the league, and Iptameni Pagodromoi Athen won their fifth league title.

First round

Final round

External links
Season on icehockey.gr

Greek Ice Hockey Championship seasons
Greek
Ice Hockey Championship season